The 2019–20 Royal Antwerp F.C. season was the club's 116th season in existence and the club's 8th consecutive season in the top flight of Belgian football. In addition to the domestic league, Antwerp participated in this season's editions of the Belgian Cup and UEFA Europa League. The season covered the period from 1 July 2019 to 1 August 2020.

Players

Current squad

Transfers

In

Out

Pre-season and friendlies

Competitions

Overview

Belgian First Division A

League table

Results summary

Results by round

Matches
On 2 April 2020, the Jupiler Pro League's board of directors proposed to cancel the season due to the COVID-19 pandemic. The General Assembly accepted the proposal on 15 May, and officially ended the 2019–20 season.

Belgian Cup

UEFA Europa League

Third qualifying round

Play-off round

Statistics

Squad appearances and goals
Last updated on 1 August 2020.

|-
! colspan=12 style=background:#dcdcdc; text-align:center|Goalkeepers

|-
! colspan=12 style=background:#dcdcdc; text-align:center|Defenders

|-
! colspan=12 style=background:#dcdcdc; text-align:center|Midfielders

|-
! colspan=12 style=background:#dcdcdc; text-align:center|Forwards

|-
! colspan=12 style=background:#dcdcdc; text-align:center|Players who have made an appearance this season but have left the club

|}

References

External links

Royal Antwerp F.C.
2019–20 UEFA Europa League participants seasons